The 2016–17 Hawaii Rainbow Warriors basketball team represented the University of Hawaii at Manoa during the 2016–17 NCAA Division I men's basketball season. The Rainbow Warriors, led by second-year head coach Eran Ganot, played their home games at the Stan Sheriff Center in Honolulu, Hawaii as members of the Big West Conference. They finished the season 14–16, 8–8 in Big West play to finish in fifth place. They lost in the quarterfinals of the Big West tournament to Long Beach State.

The Stan Sheriff Center saw its second consecutive season with a sellout (announced turnstile 9,211 out of 10,300) in an 83–68 defeat versus No. 5 North Carolina, the first instance since 1996–97 and 1997–98.

Previous season 
The Rainbow Warriors finished the 2015–16 season 28–6, 13–3 in Big West play to finish in a tie for the Big West regular-season title. They defeated the Long Beach State 49ers, the only team to sweep the Rainbow Warriors, in the finals of the Big West tournament.

The team, as a #13 seed in the 2016 NCAA tournament, defeated #4 California, 77-66, before bowing out to Maryland, a #5 seed, 73-60 in the second round.

Departures

Incoming transfers

2016 Recruiting

2017 Commitments

Roster

Schedule and results
Source: 

|-
!colspan=9 style=| Exhibition

|-
!colspan=9 style=| Non-conference regular season

|-
!colspan=9 style=| Big West Conference regular season

|-
!colspan=9 style="background:#004231; color:white;"| Big West tournament

References

Hawaii Rainbow Warriors basketball seasons
Hawai'i
Rainbow
Rain